Thana or Thânâ ( literally "police station") mean the district controlled by a police station.

History
Thana was a subdistrict in the administrative geography of Bangladesh. The Local Government Ordinance of 1982 was amended a year later, redesignating and upgrading the existing thanas as upazilas. Later in 1999 geographic regions under administrations of thanas were converted into upazilas. All administrative terms in this level were renamed from thana to upazila. The word thana is now used to solely refer to police stations. Generally, there is one police station for each upazila. However, larger administrative units may have more than one police station covering different regions.

See also
 Bangladesh Police
 :Category:Thanas of Dhaka

References 

Former subdivisions of Bangladesh